Aqidah (, plural  ʿaqāʾid, also rendered ʿaqīda, aqeeda, etc.) is an Islamic term of Arabic origin that literally means "creed". It is also called Islamic creed and Islamic theology.

Aqidah go beyond concise statements of faith and may not be part of an ordinary Muslim's religious instruction.  It has been distinguished from Iman in "taking the aspects of Iman and extending it to a detail level" often using "human interpretation or sources". Yet in contrast with Iman, Aqidah is not a term in the Qur'an.

Many schools of Islamic theology expressing different aqidah exist.  However, this term has taken a significant technical usage in the Islamic theology, and is a branch of Islamic studies describing the beliefs of Islam.

Etymology
Aqidah comes from the Semitic root ʿ-q-d, which means "to tie; knot". ("Aqidah" used not only as an expression of a school of Islamic theology or belief system, but as another word for "theology" in Islam, as in: "Theology (Aqidah) covers all beliefs and belief systems of Muslims, including sectarian differences and points of contention".)

Introduction
According to Muslim scholar Cyril Glasse, "systematic statements of belief became necessary, from early [on in the history of] Islam, initially to refute heresies, and later to distinguish points of view and to present them, as the divergences of schools of theology or opinion increased." 

The "first" creed written as "a short answer to the pressing heresies of the time" is known as Fiqh Akbar and ascribed to Abu Hanifa.
Two well known creeds were the Fiqh Akbar II "representative" of the Ash'ari, and Fiqh Akbar III, "representative" of the Shafi'i. Al-Ghazali also had an aqidah. These creeds were more detailed than those described below.

According to Malcolm Clark, while Islam "is not a creedal religion", it has produced some detailed creeds, "some containing 100 or more belief statements" that summarized "the theological position of a particular scholar or school."

Six articles of belief
The six articles of faith or belief (Arkan al-Iman) derived from the Quran and Sunnah, are accepted by all Muslims. While there are differences between Shia and Sunni Islam and other different schools or sects concerning issues such as the attributes of God or about the purpose of angels, the six articles are not disputed.

The six Sunni articles of belief are:
Belief in God  and tawhid (monotheism)
Belief in the angels
Belief in the Islamic holy books
Belief in the prophets and messengers
Belief in the Last Judgment and Resurrection
Belief in predestination

The first five are based on several Qurʾanic beliefs:
...righteous is he who believeth in God and the Last Day and the angels and the scripture and the prophets (2:177)
...believer believe in God and His angels and His scriptures and His messengers (2:285)
Whoever disbelieveth in God and His angels and His scriptures and His messengers and the Last Day, he verily wandered far stray (4:136)
Who is an enemy of God, His Angels, His Messengers, Gabriel and Michael! Then, lo! God is an enemy to the disbelievers (2:98)

The sixth point made it into the creed because of the first theological controversy in Islam. Although not connected with the Sunni-Shiʿi controversy about the succession, the majority of Twelver Shiʿites do not stress God's limitless power (qadar), but rather His boundless justice (ʿadl) as the sixth point of belief – this does not mean that Sunnis deny His justice, or Shiʿites negate His power, just that the emphasis is different.

In Sunni and Shia view, having Iman literally means having belief in the six articles.

Tawhid

Tawhid ("doctrine of Oneness") is the concept of monotheism in Islam. It is the religion's most fundamental concept and holds that God (Allah) is one (aḥad) and unique (wāḥid), and the only worthy of worship comparable to Jewish and Christian view on God, while worshipping something else is considered idolatry.

According to Islamic belief, Allah is the proper name of God, and humble submission to his will, divine ordinances and commandments is the pivot of the Muslim faith. "He is the only God, creator of the universe, and the judge of humankind." "He is unique (wāḥid) and inherently one (aḥad), all-merciful and omnipotent." The Qur'an declares the reality of Allah, His inaccessible mystery, His 99 descriptive names  expressing a quality characteristic, and His actions on behalf of His creatures.

Iman
Iman, in Islamic theology denotes a believer's faith in the metaphysical aspects of Islam. Its most simple definition is the belief in the six articles of faith, known as arkān al-īmān.

Hadith of Gabriel
The Hadith of Gabriel includes the Five Pillars of Islam (Tawhid, Salat, Sawm, Zakat, Hajj) in answer to the question, "O messenger of God, what is Islam?" This hadith is sometimes called the "truly first and most fundamental creed."

Salat
Salat is an act of worship. Salat means to call to the Lord Who created and gives life to the worshipper in Islam. This call realizes one to surrender caller's will, obeying his God. It is one of the Five Pillars of Islam. Islam gives concession conditionally if it is difficult to pray Salat in formal ways. People who find it physically difficult can perform Salat in a way suitable to them. To perform valid Salat, Muslims must be in a state of ritual purity, which is mainly achieved by ritual wash ups, (wuḍūʾ), as per prescribed procedures. Salat consists of "standing" (Qiyam) intending to call God, bow at knees (Ruku) meaning to ready to obey,  prostrate (Sajda) willing to surrender worshipper's will to God's, then  to sit (Tashhud) asserting evidence of the oneness of God and the finality of God's apostle (Nabi).

Sawm

In the terminology of Islamic law, sawm means to abstain from eating, drinking (including water) and sexual intercourse from dawn until dusk. The observance of sawm during the holy month of Ramadan is one of the Five Pillars of Islam, but is not confined to that month.

Zakat
Zakat is the practice of charitable giving by Muslims based on accumulated wealth and is obligatory for all who are able to do so. It is considered to be a personal responsibility for Muslims to ease economic hardship for others and eliminate inequality.

Hajj

The Hajj is an Islamic pilgrimage to Mecca and the largest gathering of Muslims in the world every year. It is one of the five pillars of Islam, and a religious duty which must be carried out by every able-bodied Muslim who can afford to do so at least once in his or her lifetime.

Other tenets

In addition, some Muslims include Jihad and Dawah as part of aqidah

Jihad
Jihad (to struggle) and  literally means to endeavor, strive, labor to apply oneself, to concentrate, to work hard, to accomplish. It could be used to refer to those who physically, mentally or economically serve in the way of God.

Dawah

Da‘wah ("invitation") means the proselytizing or preaching of Islam. Da‘wah literally means "issuing a summon" or "making an invitation," being an active participle of a verb meaning variously "to summon" or "to invite." A Muslim who practices da‘wah, either as a religious worker or in a volunteer community effort, is called a dā‘ī (داعي plural du‘āh, gen: du‘āt دعاة).

A dā‘ī is thus a person who invites people to understand Islam through dialogue, not unlike the Islamic equivalent of a missionary inviting people to the faith, prayer and manner of Islamic life.

Eschatology

Eschatology is literally understood as the last things or ultimate things and in Muslim theology, eschatology refers to the end of this world and what will happen in the next world or hereafter. Eschatology covers the death of human beings, their souls after their bodily death, the total destruction of this world, the resurrection of humans, the Last Judgment of human deeds by God after the resurrection, and the rewards and punishments for the believers and non-believers respectively. The places for the believers in the hereafter are known as Paradise and for the non-believers as Hell.

Schools of theology

Muslim theology is the theology and interpretation of creed (aqidah) that derived from the Qur'an and Hadith. The contents of Muslim theology can be divided into theology proper such as theodicy, eschatology, anthropology, apophatic theology, and comparative religion. In the history of Muslim theology, there have been theological schools among Muslims displaying both similarities and differences with each other in regard to beliefs.

Traditional Sunni schools

Kalam 

Kalām is an "Islamic scholastic theology" of seeking theological principles through dialectic. In Arabic, the word literally means "speech/words." A scholar of kalām is referred to as a mutakallim (Muslim theologian; plural mutakallimūn). There are many schools of Kalam, the main ones being the Mutazila, the Ash'ari and Maturidi schools in Sunni Islam. Traditionalist theology rejects the use of kalam, regarding humans reason as sinful in unseen matters.

Muʿtazilite
Muʿtazilite is an Unorthodox Sunni School. In terms of the relationship between human beings and their creator, the Muʿtazila emphasize human free will over predestination. They also reduced the divine attributes to the divine essence. The Mu’tazilites are considered heretics by all the traditional Sunni Islamic schools of theology.

Asharism 

Asharism accepts reason in regard of exegetical matters and traditionalistic ideas. What God does or commands — as revealed in the Quran and ahadith — is by definition just. What He prohibits is by definition unjust. Right and wrong are objective realities. The Quran is the uncreated word of God in essence, however it is created then it takes on a form in letters or sound.

Maturidism

Maturidism holds, that humans are creatures endowed with reason, that differentiates them from animals. Further, The relationship between people and God differs from that of nature and God; humans are endowed with free will, but due to God's sovereignty, God creates the acts the humans choose, so humans can perform them. Ethics can be understood just by reason and do not need prophetic guidances. Maturidi also considered hadiths as unreliable, when they are in odd with reason. However, the human mind alone could not grasp the entire truth, thus it is in need of revelation in regard of mysterious affairs. Further, Maturidism opposes anthropomorphism and similtute, while simultaneously does not deny the divine attributes. They must be either interpreted in the light of Tawhid or be left out.

Athari theology

For the Athari theology, the literal meaning of the Qur'an and especially the prophetic traditions have sole authority in matters of belief, as well as law, and to engage in rational disputation, even if one arrives at the truth, is absolutely forbidden. Atharis engage in an amodal reading of the Qur'an, as opposed to one engaged in Ta'wil (metaphorical interpretation). They do not attempt to rationally conceptualize the meanings of the Qur'an and believe that the real meanings should be consigned to God alone (tafwid). This theology was taken from exegesis of the Qur'an and statements of the early Muslims and later codified by a number of scholars including Ahmad ibn Hanbal and Ibn Qudamah. There are different views whether Ath’ari creed should or should not be included as a Sunni school of aqidah.

Shiʿi beliefs and practices
Shiʿi Muslims hold that there are five articles of belief. Similar to the Sunnis, the Shiʿis do not believe in complete predestination, or complete free will. They believe that in human life there is both free will and predestination.

Twelver's Roots of Religion (Uṣūl ad-Dīn)

Tawhid: The Oneness of God.
Adalah: The Justice of God.
Nubuwwah (Prophethood): God has appointed perfect and infallible prophets and messengers to teach mankind the religion (i.e. a perfect system on how to live in "peace.")
Imamate: (Leadership): God has appointed specific leaders to lead and guide mankind —  a prophet appoints a custodian of the religion before his demise.
Last Judgment: God will raise mankind for Judgment

Ismaili beliefs
The branch of Islam known as Isma'ilism is the second largest Shiʿi community. They observe the following extra pillars:
Belief in the Imamate
Belief in the prophets and messengers
Beliefs about the Last Judgment

Literature pertaining to creed
Many Muslim scholars have written Islamic creeds, or specific aspects of a aqidah. The following list contains some of the most well-known creeds.

Sunni literature
Mukhtasar Shu'ab al-Imān or "The 77 branches of faith" by the Imām al-Bayhaqi
Al-Fiqh Al-Akbar  by Imām Abu Hanifa
al-ʿAqīdah aṭ-Ṭaḥāwiyya ("The Fundamentals of Islamic Creed by al-Tahawi). This has been accepted by almost all Sunnis (Atharis, Ash'aris and Maturidis). Several Islamic scholars have written about the Tahawiyya creed, including Ali al-Qari, al-Maydani, ibn Abi al-Izz and Abd al-Aziz ibn Baz.
As- Sunnah by Imām Ahmad ibn Hanbal
Al- Iman by al-Adni 
As-Sunnah by Imām Abu Dawood
Sarihus Sunnah by Imām Al-Tabari
As-Sunnah by Imām Al-Tabarani
Aqīdah Salafi Ahl al-Hadith by al-Sabuni 
I'tīqad Ahl Al-Sunnah wal Jām'ah by Imām Lalqai Hibatullah 
As- Sunnah by Nasr al- Marwazi 
Ash-Shariah by al-Ajurri 
Al-Iman by Ibn Mandah 
Ad- Durrātu fīma yazibu i'tiqaduhu by Imām Ibn Hazm
Kitāb at- Tāwhid by Imām Ibn Rajab
Al- 'Aqīdah al-Nasafiyya by Imām Najm al-Din 'Umar al-Nasafi
Ar-rīsālah al-kairoāniyah by Abi Zaid al-Kairoa
Al-I'tīqad by Al-Bayhaqi 
Al-ʿAqīdah al-Wāsiṭiyyah ("The Wasit Creed") by ibn Taymiyyah.
Sharh as Sunnah or the Explanation of the Sunna by al-Hasan ibn 'Ali al-Barbahari. Lists approximately 170 points pertaining to the fundamentals of aqidah.
Khalq Afʿāl al-ʿIbād ("The Creation of the Acts of Servants") by Muhammad al-Bukhari. It shows the opinion of early scholars (Salaf) but it does not cover all topics.
Lum'at al-Itiqād by ibn Qudamah. Details the creed of the early Imams of the Sunni Muslims and one of the key works in the Athari creed.
al-ʿUluww by al-Dhahabī. Details the opinions of early scholars on matters of creed.
Ibaanah ān ūsulid diyanah by Abu al-Hasan al-Ash'ari.
Risālah al-Qudsiyyah ("The Jerusalem Tract") by al-Ghazali, where the rules of faith are discussed.
Sa'd al-Din al-Taftazani on the creed of Abu Hafs Umar an-Nasafi

Shia literature
Shiʿite Islam Muhammad Husayn Tabataba'i: translated by Hossein Nasr; (also reprinted under the title Shi'a.)"Root and Branches of Faith by Maqbul Hussein RahimShi'ism Doctrines, Thought and Spirituality'' by Hossein Nasr

Importance
Manzoor Elahi in his book "Samāja sanskārē saṭhika ākīdāra gurutba" (The Importance of Right Aqeedah in Social Reformation) says about the "necessity of reforming society and the role and importance of correct Islamic Aqeedah in that context",

Gallery

See also

Arsh
Bidah
Contemporary Islamic philosophy
Glossary of Islam
Iman (Islam)
Index of Islam-related articles
Islamic eschatology
Islamic schools and branches
Islamic studies
Kufr
Madhhab
Outline of Islam
Schools of Islamic theology
Shahada
Shia–Sunni relations
Shia crescent
Shirk (Islam)
Succession to Muhammad
Sunnah
Sufi-Salafi relations
Tawhid

References

Islamic theology
Islamic terminology